"I Don't Wanna Leave" is a song by Australian alternative dance group Rüfüs Du Sol, released on 22 October 2021 as the fourth single from their fourth studio album, Surrender. The Katzki directed music video premiered the same day. The song debuted a number 70 on the ARIA Charts.

At the 2022 ARIA Music Awards, the song as nominated for ARIA Award for Best Video.

Reception
In an album review, Cat Woods from NME Australia said "[Lindqvist's] brooding vocals sound otherworldly, both melodic and melancholic in equal measure."

Also in an album review, Ryan Middleton from Magnetic Magazine said "The track has all the makings of a new set closer as Tyrone Lindqvist exclaims 'I don't want to leave right now, stay with me for one more night.'"

Track listings

Charts

References

2021 singles
2021 songs
Songs written by Jason Evigan
Rüfüs Du Sol songs